Outskirts is the debut studio album by Canadian country rock group Blue Rodeo, released in March 1987 through Risqué Disque. The singles "Try" and "Rose-Coloured Glasses" were hits in Canada, where "Outskirts" and "Rebel" also made the singles charts.

To mark the 25th anniversary of the album, Blue Rodeo released a two-LP vinyl remixed edition, Outskirts Remix, on November 27, 2012.

On the thirtieth anniversary of the album's release, Jim Cuddy posted the following message on the band's website: "The first night we started to make Outskirts was also the night my wife Rena went into labour with our first child Devin. So needless to say it was an unforgettable night. The record came out to a deafening silence. Not a single radio station played the first single, 'Outskirts'. We sold 5000 records which we thought was amazing but were told we would be dropped if nothing else happened. So much has happened since then but I still hold onto the feelings from those early days of tearing it up in a club with nothing to lose. We could never have dreamed of being where we are today and looking back on 30 years of playing music together. Sometimes life surprises you."

Track listing
All songs written by Greg Keelor and Jim Cuddy.
"Heart Like Mine"  – 4:38 [Release Date: February 19, 1988]
"Rose-Coloured Glasses"  – 4:25 [Release Date: February 7, 1988]
"Rebel"  – 3:47 [Release Date: February 28, 1987]
"Joker's Wild"  – 4:02 [Release Date: March 9, 1988]
"Piranha Pool"  – 6:27 [Release Date: March 6, 1987]
"Outskirts"  – 4:45 [Release Date: February 8, 1988]
"Underground"  – 5:05 [Release Date: February 27, 1987]
"5 Will Get You Six"  – 4:22 [Release date: March 1, 1988]
"Try"  – 4:03
"Floating"  – 7:32 [Release Date: March 7, 1988]

Chart performance

Certifications

References

1987 debut albums
Blue Rodeo albums
Albums produced by Terry Brown (record producer)